Egízio Antônio Calloni (born 6 December 1961, in São Paulo) is a Brazilian actor, best known for Os Dias Eram Assim (2017), Dois Irmãos (2017), and Brazilian Western (2013).

Filmography

Television

Cinema

References

Brazilian actors
1961 births
Living people
Male actors from São Paulo